Windows 10 Anniversary Update (also known as version 1607 and codenamed "Redstone 1") is the second major update to Windows 10 and the first in a series of updates under the Redstone codenames. It carries the build number 10.0.14393. This update, as the name applies, is to celebrate the first anniversary of Windows 10. It was released  after its launch.

PC version history
The first preview was released on December 16, 2015. The final release was made available to Windows Insiders on July 18, 2016, followed by a public release on August 2. This release of Windows 10 is supported for users of the Current Branch (CB), Current Branch for Business (CBB) and Long-Term Support Branch (LTSB).

Mobile version history

See also
Windows 10 version history
Windows 10 Mobile version history

References

Windows 10
History of Microsoft
Software version histories